Chetan (born 30 September 1970) is an Indian actor who works in Tamil-language television and films. He is married to television actress Devadarshini who starred with him in Vidadhu Karuppu. This was part of the television series Marmadesam.

He has had regular roles in television serials such as Ananda Bhavan and Metti Oli.

Career
Chetan's top turnover was on the 811-episode Sun TV serial, Metti Oli.

Personal life
His mother tongue is Kannada. He is married to frequent co-star Devadarshini. They have a daughter, Niyathi Kadambi who made her acting debut in '96 portraying the younger version of Devadarshini.

Filmography

Television

Ramayanam
Marmadesam: Vidathu Karuppu as Rajendran/Karuppusami
Nimmathi Ungal Choice as Balram
Kudumbam
Irandam Chanakyan as Santhana Raman
Vazhkkai as Rishi
Nambikkai as Vasanth & Raja
Thedathe Tholainthu Povai
Kaveri
Panchavarnakkili as Raghupathi
Ananda Bhavan as Ganesh
Thurupidikkum Manasu
Metti Oli as Manikkam
Ramany vs Ramany Part 1
Adugiran Kannan as Kannan
En Thozhi En Kadhali En Manaivi
Malargal as Kathirvel
Lakshmi as Aravind
Athipookal as Manohar
Simran Thirai: Kannamoochi Ray Ray
Nagamma
En Peyar Ranganayagi as SrikanthRudhraveenai as SwaminathanUthiripookkal'' as Sivanesan

Films
Actor

Dubbing artist

References

1970 births
Living people
Tamil male actors
Tamil male television actors
Tamil television presenters
Television personalities from Tamil Nadu
Male actors from Tamil Nadu
Male actors in Tamil cinema
Tamil Reality dancing competition contestants
21st-century Indian male actors